Sleepless in __ is the second extended play by South Korean hip hop group Epik High. The EP was released on March 11, 2019 through OURS Co. and distributed by Genie Music.

Accolades

Track listing 
Credits adapted from Naver and Apple Music.

Charts

Release history

Notes

References 

2019 EPs
Epik High albums
Genie Music EPs
Articles with underscores in the title